Martin Faxon Russ (February 14, 1931, in Newark, New Jersey – December 6, 2010 in Oakville, California) was an American military author, Marine, and associate professor at Carnegie-Mellon University. His first book, The Last Parallel, a New York Times bestseller and a Book of the Month Club selection, was based (with changed names) on his service in the First Battalion of the First Regiment of the First Marine Division during the Korean War. 
J. D. Salinger called it “a very legitimate, sinewy, authentic war book”; it was later optioned, but not produced, by director Stanley Kubrick. Most of his later work was based on interviews with combat veterans.

Publications 

Fiction
 Half Moon Haven (1959)
 War Memorial (1967)

Non-ficton
 Happy Hunting Ground (1968)
 Line of Departure: Tarawa. Doubleday (1975). 
 Breakout: The Chosin Reservoir Campaign, Korea 1950. Penguin Books (2000). 

Memoirs
 The Last Parallel (1957)
 Showdown Semester: Advice from a Writing Professor (1988)

References

1931 births
2010 deaths
United States Marines
American military writers